Welcome 2 Life is a 2019 South Korean television series starring Jung Ji-hoon, Lim Ji-yeon and Kwak Si-yang. It aired on MBC TV from August 5 to September 24, 2019.

Synopsis
The series is about a skilled lawyer who enters a parallel world due to an unfortunate accident.

Cast

Main
 Jung Ji-hoon as Lee Jae-sang, an ace but selfish lawyer from JK Law Firm, one of the nation's top five law firms.
 Lim Ji-yeon as Ra Si-on, Jae-sang's ex-girlfriend who is an impulsive detective and has a tough personality.
 Kwak Si-yang as Goo Dong-tae, a police officer who is Si-on's partner.

Supporting

Yulgaek Law Firm
 Han Sang-jin as Kang yoon-gi
 Hong Jin-gi as Moon Ji-ho

Sekyung Police Department
 Park Shin-ah as Ha Min-hee
 Im Sung-jae as Yang Go-woon

Sekyung Prosecution
 Choi Phillip as Min Sung-jin
 Jang So-yeon as Bang Young-suk

Others
 Han Da-sol as In Na-rae
 Shin Jae-ha as Yoon Pil-woo, the CEO of Babel Research Center.
 Seo Hye-won as Ring
 Son Byong-ho as Jang Doo-sik
 Kim Joong-ki as Park Gi-beom
 Seol Jung-hwan as Jeong Min-soo, an actor.
 Song Yoo-hyun as Yoo Jin-hee

Release
The series was initially scheduled to premiere on July 29, 2019, but was pushed back for a week due to live coverage of the 2019 World Aquatics Championships.

Ratings

Awards and nominations

Notes

References

External links
  
 
 

MBC TV television dramas
Korean-language television shows
2019 South Korean television series debuts
2019 South Korean television series endings
South Korean fantasy television series
South Korean romantic comedy television series
Television series about parallel universes
Television series by Kim Jong-hak Production